Lubno may refer to:
Lubno, West Pomeranian Voivodeship (north-west Poland)
Lubno, Lubusz Voivodeship (west Poland)
Lubno (Frýdlant nad Ostravicí) (part of Frýdlant nad Ostravicí, east Czech Republic)

See also
Łubno (disambiguation)